Lively is an unincorporated community in Benton County, Missouri, United States.

A post office called Lively was established in 1900, and remained in operation until 1913. The community was named for its "lively" business district.

References

Unincorporated communities in Benton County, Missouri
Unincorporated communities in Missouri